Jorge Brito (1925–1996) was a painter, sculptor and muralist. He is famous for having signed the Manifesto of four young artists (Manifiesto de cuatro jóvenes)   distributed at the opening of the National Art
Exhibition of Buenos Aires, in which four art students opposed the institution and identified their opponents as the "stonecutters". In the pamphlet, they questioned the orientation sought to be imposed on art education, by both mediocre winners and the "vanguard" jurors who rewarded them. The manifesto was signed by Jorge Brito, Claudio Girola, Tomas Maldonado and Alfredo Hlito who, in 1942, were students of the National School of Fine Arts Prilidiano Pueyrredón.

Attracted by the teachings of Joaquín Torres García, he traveled to Montevideo and went to his 'Taller' although not being part of it. In Uruguay, he devoted to painting, mural art and he taught industrial design. In 1962, after participating in the first exhibition of MAMBA, he moved to Venezuela. In 1968 he settled in Paris, where he continued his work as a painter and put particular interest in printmaking and sculpture.

Biographical chronology 

1925 
Jorge Brito was born in Buenos Aires on June 11.

1938–1941 
Studied at the Fine Arts National School Manuel Belgrano.

1942 
Entered the National School of Decorative Arts Prilidiano Pueyrredón. 
In September he signed the Manifesto of Four Young, with Claudio Ambulatory, Alfredo Hlito and Tomas Maldonado.

1943 
Attracted by the teachings of Joaquín Torres García traveled to Montevideo. He approached the workshop but not made part of it.

1944 
Moved to the city of Cordoba Argentina, where he met the art teacher Lola Altamira (Granada, Spain, 1924-Buenos Aires, 2008), whom he married.

1945 
Along with young Cordovan student Antonio Pezzino traveled to Montevideo. 
At first Pezzino and Brito moved into a studio located in Peach and Convention streets near where José Gurvich lived and then settled in the workshop Manuel Aguiar had in Pocitos. He closed ties with several members of the Torres García. 
Later came Lola and her little son Cristian.

1947

One of the portraits sent to the XI National Painting and Sculpture ROU scored Foreign Artist Award, Silver Medal. 
He made his first solo exhibition at the Libertarian Club of Montevideo. As part of its sample gave a lecture "Two streams in abstract painting".

1948 
Between January 30 and February 8 participated in the Uruguayan Painters Exhibition, held at the Casino Míguez Hotel, Punta del Este.

1950 
He was appointed professor of applied in Uruguay Industrial Design School. 
He started his experiences in ceramics.

1951 
His oil painting won the London-Paris Bronze Medal Award from the XV National Painting and Sculpture ROU.

1952 
he was appointed Director of the School of Arts Department of the Uruguayan city of Melo.

1953 
In May spoke on "The viewer and the art" in the 1st. Cycle Cultural of Events and Art organized by the Club Union de Melo. 
In Melo (ROU) Pablo, his second son was born. 
He participated in the XVII National Hall (ROU) with his oil paintings ''Lovers' and 'The Christ'. 
He presented a solo show of paintings at Friends of the Arts in Montevideo.

1954 He made three murals in the city of Montevideo, including a ceramic relief in a building designed by the architect Vaz Nadal.

1956 
He won the prize in the contest organized by the Ministry of Education of Uruguay for wall decoration Practice School No. 2 "Cervantes", located on the street Soriano 1658 Montevideo.
In August, his oil  'Comedians' won the Alien Artist Award - Silver Medal in the XX National Exhibition of Fine Arts ROU.

His son Cristian died.

1958 He returned to Argentina and continued his work. The family settled in the garden district of El Palomar, where Cristina, his third daughter was born. 
He Taught the conference "Art and Society" at the Faculty of Architecture of Buenos Aires.

1959 
He designed the poster for the theater performance of Hamlet, directed by Miguel Bebán in Lassalle Theater in Buenos Aires. 
He linked the Architect Mauricio Rantz and Rodolfo Cortegoso, with whom he made a mural in glazed pottery in the lobby of the building 1214 Anchorena street.

He made scenery, ceramics, illustration and industrial design.

1960 
He was commissioned and began work to decorate the gallery Le Boulevard, located at Avda. Rivadavia 6800 in the Flores neighborhood in Buenos Aires. 
José Gurvich and his wife Toto traveled to Buenos Aires and stayed at his home in El Palomar. There Gurvich painted a series of constructive tables. 
In September, he held an exhibition of paintings and drawings from the years 1959 to 1960 in the Gallery "Group 8" next to Plaza Cagancha Montevideo. 
He was selected by Rafael Squirm and participated in the First Exhibition International Modern Art opened on October 12 at the headquarters of the Buenos Aires Museum of Modern Art.

1961 He completed a fresco plaster frieze over an area of 113 meters long and 2.8 m in height to the Gallery Le Boulevard, the project was made for Cortegoso and Rantz architects. The work involved the collaboration of Coli, Saa, Batistin, Rocha and Rodriguez.

He also designed and executed the mural in glazed ceramic residence at Traful street 3715.

On November 11 he delivered the lecture "Approaches to a concept of plastic decoration" at the Aula Magna of the Faculty of Architecture, organized by the Student Center of Art and Architecture Student Center.

1964 He participated with three works in the I Salon of Young Artists from Latin America, organized by the Pan American Union in the Museo de Bellas Artes.

1968 
traveled to Europe. In the early days he toured Spain, Italy and France and then settled permanently in Paris.

1969 
Formed couple with Blandine Deboeuf.
 
1970 In Paris, he was reunited with his friend Manuel Aguiar, also based in that city.

1971 Under the Caracas Cultural Plan, presented easel painting and sketches of murals in the Reading Room of the Plaza Bolivar and gave a lecture entitled "Problems of Plastic".

1973 His son Francisco was born in Paris.

1976 Between October 21 and November 12 he exhibited sculptures at Galerie Doddoli in Paris.

1977 
Between November 3 and 26 he participated in the exhibition  ' Ten Rioplatenses Artists' performed at Gallery Maître Albert, Paris, next to C. Carrá, Deira, Gamarra, Krasno, Marcos Martinez, Novoa, Vanarsky and Vermijian. Brito exhibited his sculptures in bronze of small and medium format.

1978 He made 'Hamlet' – cast bronze medal, 122 x 115 mm – for Grand Fontes Series, published in the Bulletin Le Club Français de la Médaille No. 58 - Monnaie de Paris.

He made the medal 'Violence Du Temp' (Hommage à Simone Weil) – cast bronze, 160 x 150 mm – for the series Grandes Fontes, published in the Bulletin Le club française médaille No. 61 - Monnaie de Paris.

He created 'Faust' medal,  – cast bronze 130 x 134 mm – for Grandes Fontes Series, published in the Bulletin Le Club Français de la Médaille No. 59-60 - Monnaie de Paris.

1979 
Between March 1 and 24 exhibited his works at Gallery Maître Albert, Paris.

In the same city exhibited prints, drawings and paintings Forum, Galerie d'Art, between March 7 and April 7.

He cast the medal 'Du Jeu des Masques' – bronze, 170 x 93 mm – for Grandes Fontes Series, published in the Bulletin Le Club Français de la Médaille No. 65 - Monnaie de Paris.

1980 Between February 7 and March 4 his drawings were presented in the exhibition organized at Galerie Valmay of Paris.

He made the medal 'Hommage à Kafka' – bronze, 170 x 130 mm – for Grandes Fontes Series, published in the Bulletin Le Club Français de la Médaille No. 68 - Monnaie de Paris.

1983 Medal 'Image Sécrete'  – bronze, 200 x 170 mm – for Grandes Fontes Series, published in the Bulletin Le Club Français de la Médaille No. 81 - Monnaie de Paris.

1984 
In January he participated in the exhibition 'Rumeurs d'hiver', organized by the Galérie Valmay. The group of artists was formed by: Brenta, Castro, Delisle, Drai, Janine Frossard, Gryska, Hettner of Kermoal, Lacroix, Laforest, Mandeville, May, Mirem, Murique, Panasiuk, Sterling, Teillac, Wieckowski, Wierusz

Medal-object L'homme et le Mystère'  – bronze, 120 x 110 mm – for Grandes Fontes, published in the Bulletin Club Français de la Médaille No. 82-83 -. Monnaie de Paris

Medal 'L'illusion d'être' – bronze, 110 x 95 mm – for Grandes Fontes, published in the Bulletin Club Français de la Médaille No. 85 -. Monnaie de Paris
Medal 'Antonio Machado' – bronze, 68 mm – for Effigies Series, Poets of the Twentieth Century, published in the Bulletin Club Français de la Médaille No. 86-7 - Monnaie de Paris. With this medal participated in the exhibition Médailleurs Epagnols et Français, held in November at Casa de Velázquez.

1985 Medal-object 'Point Oméga' – bronze, 140 x 115 mm – for Grand Fontes Series, published in the Bulletin Le Club Français de la Médaille No. 86-7 - Monnaie de Paris.

1986 
Formed couple with Anne Guglielmetti.

He made the medal-object Paradoxe du miroir – bronze 160 x 125 mm – for Grand Fontes Series, published in the Bulletin Le Club Français de la Médaille No. 92 - Monnaie de Paris.

1987 Medal 'Tango' – bronze, 200 x 140 mm – published in the Revue de la Médaille d'Art Métal Pensant - Monnaie de Paris.

1988 
Participated in 'Paris / Prague - Art and artists seen through the medal and the sculpture of the twentieth century', presented between March 15 and April 30 de abril at the Monnaie de Paris Gallery.

1990 
Created 'Ange musicien' – bronze medal, 220 x 90 mm –, published in the Revue de la Médaille d'Art Métal Pensant -. Monnaie de Paris

Medal 'Hommage à Rilke' - Bronze 100 x 100 mm- published in the Revue de la Médaille d'Art Métal Pensant - Monnaie de Paris.

At this time also created  'Initiation au Vol' and 'Retour du fils prodige'.

1991 
'Sonnet de la Mélancolie – medal in bronze 100 mm – published in the Revue de la Médaille d'Art Métal Pensant - Monnaie de Paris.

1992 Grand daughter Uli Krown (formerly Brito) was born in Vancouver, BC Canada (daughter of Jorge's son Francois Brito) and all met in Paris in the fall of 1992.

1996 Died in Paris on February 17.

References 

 Cristina Rossi - Jorge Brito, a través del Misterio
 website

External links 

 Jorge Brito, pintor, escultor y muralista
 Manifiesto de cuatro jóvenes ( 4 young artists manifesto)

Argentine artists
Muralists
1925 births
1996 deaths
Argentine emigrants to France